Leal Conselheiro ("Loyal Counselor") is a 1438 philosophical treatise by Portuguese king Duarte I. It considers the moral and spiritual side of living well and the responsibility of governance. In particularly, he defends the war against Moors. The manuscript with Leal Conselheiro and Bem cavalgar was seized by Charles VIII of France in 1495 and transferred to France. Now it is kept at the French National Library, Paris.

References

Portuguese literature
Medieval literature